Karoline Eichhorn (born 9 November 1965) is a German stage, film, television, and voice actor.

Life and career
Eichhorn went to a Waldorf school in Stuttgart, graduated in 1986, and then attended the Folkwang University of the Arts in Essen until 1989. From 1989 until 1995, she held engagements at Schaubühne and Schauspielhaus Bochum theaters. Starting in 2017, Eichhorn starred as Charlotte Doppler in the ensemble cast of the acclaimed Netflix production Dark.

In the latter, she plays a journalist who as part of her research, spies on a shady crime writer played by Götz George. Eichhorn mainly works in theater, such as the Thalia Theater in Hamburg and the Burgtheater in Vienna, but she consistently appears in television and film productions.

Eichhorn is married to Danish writer Arne Nielsen and lives with him and their daughter, Jule, in Hamburg. In 2012, she was a member of the international jury of the 61st International Filmfestival Mannheim-Heidelberg.

Selected filmography

Film

Television

Awards
 Silberner Löwe – best new actress for The Sandman (1996)
 Bavarian TV Awards for Gegen Ende der Nacht (1998)
 Adolf-Grimme-Preis for Gegen Ende der Nacht (together with Oliver Storz, Stefan Kurt, and Bruno Ganz – 1999)
 Bavarian Film Awards – best actress for A Map of the Heart (2001)

References

External links
 
 Karoline Eichhorn at Schlag talent agency

1965 births
Living people
German film actresses
German television actresses
20th-century German actresses
21st-century German actresses